Uzda is a city in Minsk Region, Belarus. It is the administrative center of Uzda District. As of 2009, its population was 10,000. The town's name means "bridle".

History
Uzda was first referred to in 1450 as a country estate belonging to the Korsaks. From the second part of the sixteenth century, it belonged to the Kavechinskys, Zavishas, and Krasinskys. In 1574, Symon Budny spent time there working on a Bible publication. In 1793, it became a part of the Russian Empire. In 1798, the owner of the town, Kasimir Zaviha, built a wooden Catholic church named the Exaltation of the Holy Cross (preserved to the present day). At the time there was also a functioning Orthodox church named Saint Peter and Paul. In 1839–1849, the town had a printer, a school, four primary schools, a brewery, a mill, a pharmacy, a post office, 30 shops and a Sunday Fair. In 1886, it had a public college, a local board of administration, a school, a distillery, a brewery, a cloth factory, two mills, 24 shops, Orthodox and Catholic churches, a synagogue, a mosque, and three prayer houses. From 1894 to 1939, the population increased from 2,800 to 3,500 people. The Jewish population in Uzda in 1900 was assessed as 2,068 people. 
On 1 July 1924, it was made the center of the Uzda district of the Minsk region. On 28 June 1941, it was occupied by Nazi Germany. About 5,600 people, including 1,740 Jews in the ghetto, were murdered. On 29 June 1944, it was liberated by the 300th Voroshilov Partisan Brigade. On 25 December 1962, it was made a part of Dzerzhinsk district. On 30 July 1966, it became an independent district. Between 1970 and 1989, the population increased from 4,300 people to 9,500.

Geography
Uzda is located 72 km south-west of Minsk, 31 km from the town of Stoŭbcy, and 24 km from the town of Dzyarzhynsk. Both of these towns are crossed by the M1 highway (part of European route E30).

Demography 
Population

Notable people
 

 Devorah Baron, pioneering Jewish writer
 Salomon Bernstein, painter
 Moshe Feinstein, American Orthodox rabbi, came from this town, before emigrating to the United States

References

External links

 Uzda official website
 

Towns in Belarus
Populated places in Minsk Region
Uzda District
1450 establishments
Minsk Voivodeship
Igumensky Uyezd
Holocaust locations in Belarus